In the mathematical field of graph theory, the Szekeres snark is a snark with 50 vertices and 75 edges. It was the fifth known snark, discovered by George Szekeres in 1973.

As a snark, the Szekeres graph is a connected, bridgeless cubic graph with chromatic index equal to 4. The Szekeres snark is non-planar and non-hamiltonian but is hypohamiltonian. It has book thickness 3 and queue number 2.

Another well known snark on 50 vertices is the Watkins snark discovered by John J. Watkins in 1989.

Gallery

References 

Individual graphs
Regular graphs